The praetorian prefect was a high office in the Roman Empire. Originating as the commander of the Praetorian Guard, the office gradually acquired extensive legal and administrative functions, with its holders becoming the Emperor's chief aides. Under Constantine I, the office was much reduced in power and transformed into a purely civilian administrative post, while under his successors, territorially-defined praetorian prefectures emerged as the highest-level administrative division of the Empire. The prefects again functioned as the chief ministers of the state, with many laws addressed to them by name. In this role, praetorian prefects continued to be appointed by the Eastern Roman Empire (and the Ostrogothic Kingdom) until the reign of Heraclius in the 7th century AD, when wide-ranging reforms reduced their power and converted them to mere overseers of provincial administration. The last traces of the prefecture disappeared in the Byzantine Empire by the 840s.

The term praefectus praetorio was often abbreviated in inscriptions as "PR PR" or "PPO".

History

Commander of the Praetorian Guard 
Under the empire the praetorians or imperial guards were commanded by one, two, or even three praefects (praefecti praetorio), who were chosen by the emperor from among the equites and held office at his pleasure. From the time of Alexander Severus the post was open to senators also, and if an equestrian was appointed he was at the same time raised to the senate. Down to the time of Constantine, who deprived the office of its military character, the prefecture of the guards was regularly held by tried soldiers, often by men who had fought their way up from the ranks. In course of time the command seems to have been enlarged so as to include all the troops in Italy except the corps commanded by the city praefect (cohortes urbanae).

The special position of the praetorians made them a power in their own right in the Roman state, and their prefect, the praefectus praetorio, soon became one of the more powerful men in this society. The emperors tried to flatter and control the praetorians, but they staged many coups d'état and contributed to a rapid rate of turnover in the imperial succession. The praetorians thus came to destabilize the Roman state, contrary to their purpose. The praetorian prefect became a major administrative figure in the later empire, when the post combined in one individual the duties of an imperial chief of staff with direct command over the guard also. Diocletian greatly reduced the power of these prefects as part of his sweeping reform of the empire's administrative and military structures.

Transformation to administrator 

In addition to his military functions, the praetorian prefect came to acquire jurisdiction over criminal affairs, which he exercised not as the delegate but as the representative of the emperor. By the time of Diocletian he had become a kind of grand-vizier as the emperor's vice-regent and 'prime minister.' Constantine removed active military command in 312. The prefect remained as chief quarter-master general responsible for the logistical supply of the army. The prefect was the chief financial officer whose office drew up the global imperial budget. His office drew up the state liturgical obligations laid on the richer inhabitants of the Empire. He ceased to be head of administration which had to be shared with the master of the offices attached to the palace. Constantine in 331 confirmed that from the sentence of the praetorian praefect there should be no appeal. A similar jurisdiction in civil cases was acquired by him not later than the time of Septimius Severus. Hence a knowledge of law became a qualification for the post, which under Marcus Aurelius and Commodus, but especially from the time of Severus, was held by the first jurists of the age, (e.g. Papinian, Ulpian, Paulus) and, under Justinianus, John the Cappadocian, while the military qualification fell more and more into the background.

The tetrarchy reform of Diocletian (c. 296) multiplied the office: there was a praetorian prefect as chief of staff (military and administrative)—rather than commander of the guard—for each of the two Augusti, but not for the two Caesars. Each praetorian prefect oversaw one of the four quarters created by Diocletian, which became regional praetorian prefectures for the young sons of Constantine ca 330 A.D. From 395 there two imperial courts, at Rome (later Ravenna) and Constantinople, but the four prefectures remained as the highest level of administrative division, in charge of several  dioceses (groups of Roman provinces), each of which was headed by a Vicarius.
 
Under Constantine I, the institution of the magister militum deprived the praetorian prefecture altogether of its military character but left it the highest civil office of the empire.

Post-imperial era 
With the fall of the western part of the Empire into the hands of warlords, these, in order to have support in their new domains, recognized the supremacy of the emperor of the eastern part, reuniting at least de iure the Empire under him, the prefectures were maintained as a way of delimiting the new viceroyaltys:

 First Flavius Odoacer and later Flavius Theodoricus were granted the prefecture of Italy;
 Louis I was recognized as the prefect of Gaul (which served him as a pretext to seize the Visigoths' territories in Gaul);
 the Visigoths were recognized for their dominion over the prefecture of Hispania;
 and the Vandals theirs over Africa.

This recognition would be maintained until the rise of Justinian I, who ended the Ostrogothic and Vandal domains, but continued to recognize the Franks (as they were both Catholics) and the Visigoths (due to the lack of strength to continue the Recuperatio Imperii, but managing to establish a pro-Byzantine king, Athanagild, and the conquest of Spania).

List of known prefects of the Praetorian Guard 
The following is a list of all known prefects of the Praetorian Guard, from the establishment of the post in 2 BC by Augustus until the abolishment of the Guard in 314. The list is presumed to be incomplete due to the lack of sources documenting the exact number of persons who held the post, what their names were and what the length of their tenure was. Likewise, the Praetorians were sometimes commanded by a single prefect, as was the case with for example Sejanus or Burrus, but more often the emperor appointed two commanders, who shared joint leadership. Overlapping terms on the list indicate dual command.

Julio-Claudian dynasty (2 BC – AD 68)

Year of the Four Emperors (AD 68 – 69)

Flavian dynasty (AD 69 – 96)

Five Good Emperors to Didius Julianus (AD 96 – 193)

Severan dynasty (AD 193 – 235)

Crisis of the Third Century (AD 235 – 285)

Tetrarchy to Constantine I (AD 285 – 324)

See also
For praetorian prefects after the reformation of the office by emperor Constantine I, see:
Praetorian prefecture of Italy
Praetorian prefecture of Gaul
Praetorian prefecture of the East
Praetorian prefecture of Illyricum
A further prefecture was established by emperor Justinian I in the 6th century:

 Praetorian prefecture of Africa

Notes

References 

Ancient Roman titles
Gubernatorial titles
Lists of office-holders in ancient Rome
Lists of equites
Military ranks of ancient Rome
Positions of authority
 
Praetorian Guard
 
1st-century BC establishments in the Roman Empire
4th-century disestablishments in the Roman Empire